The 2011 Tour du Haut Var was the 43rd edition of the Tour du Haut Var cycling stage race. It was being held 19–20 February 2011 in the French department of the Var, and was rated as a 2.1 event on the UCI Europe Tour.

Teams and cyclists
There were 18 teams in the 2011 Tour du Haut Var. Among them were five UCI ProTeams, nine UCI Professional Continental teams, and four Continental teams. Each team was allowed eight riders on their squad, giving the event a peloton of 142 cyclists at its outset.

The 18 teams in the race were:

UCI ProTeams

UCI Professional Continental Teams

UCI Continental Teams

Tour stages

Stage 1
19 February 2011 – La Croix Valmer to Grimaud,

Stage 2
20 February 2011 – Draguignan to Draguignan,

Classification leadership
In the 2011 Tour du Haut Var, four different jerseys were awarded. For the general classification, calculated by adding each cyclist's finishing times on each stage. The leader received a yellow jersey. This classification was considered the most important of the Tour du Haut Var, and the winner is considered the winner of the Tour.

Additionally, there was a youth classification, which awarded a white jersey. It is calculated in the same way as the general classification, but is only open to riders born in 1988 or later.

There was also a mountains classification, which awarded a red jersey. In the mountains classification, points were won by reaching the top of a mountain before other cyclists. Each climb was categorized, with the more difficult climbs awarding more points.

The points classification awarded a green jersey. In the points classification, cyclists got points based on the order at the finish line of each stage. The stage win afforded 25 points, second on the stage was worth 20, third 16, fourth 13, fifth 10, sixth 8, seventh 6, eighth 4, ninth 2, and tenth was worth a single point. The points awarded in the sprints classification counted equivalently for this classification. In addition, points were awarded for the intermediate sprints, with 6, 4 and 2 points rewarded to, respectively, the first, second and third-place winners of the intermediate sprints.

The race also awarded a teams classification, which, too, was not represented by a jersey. The teams classification was calculated by adding the times of each team's best three riders per stage per day.

References

2011
2011 in French sport
2011 UCI Europe Tour